Fedor Chudinov (born 15 September 1987) is a Russian professional boxer. He held the WBA (Super) super-middleweight title in 2016, having previously held the regular title from 2015 to 2016 and the interim title from 2014 to 2015. He is the brother of fellow boxer Dmitry Chudinov.

Early life 
Fedor Chudinov was born on 15 September 1987 in Bratsk, in Irkutsk Oblast, Russia. He lived there until he was 10 years old, after which his family decided to move to the city of Serpukhov, a city close to the capital of Moscow. His grandfather, Vladimir Soloshenko, a distinguished engineer and production plant, was a large influence on him growing up. He is said to have taken up the sport of boxing at the age of 12.

Professional career 

In 2009, both Fedor and his brother Dmitry received an offer to move to the US and begin their professional career. Despite their coach Alexey Galeev opposing the idea, they accepted the offer and moved to the US.

His professional debut was on 10 July 2009, against American boxer Shawn Kirk at the Reno Events Center in Reno, Nevada. Fedor won the four-rounder via first-round technical knockout (TKO) with 0:33 seconds left on the clock, securing the first pro win of his career.

On 11 September 2014, he fought Australian Ben McCulloch in his home country. Chudinov was visibly the stronger fighter, after McCulloch decided to trade with the Russian, Chudinov landed an overhead right that knocked his opponent out cold. With this win, he secured the WBA interim super-middleweight title, which would subsequently lead him to a fight for the full world title.

In his first world title fight, for the WBA super-middleweight title, he challenged champion Felix Sturm on his own turf in Germany. The home fighter had some success early in the fight, proving more active with his punches. However, Chudinov showed great ring IQ and skill, especially in the latter part of the fight, to cause some serious damage to Sturm. He would end up winning the fight by a split-decision (SD) and win his first ever world title.

On 26 September 2015, he was scheduled to make his first defense of the title, in the UK, against British boxer Frank Buglioni, then ranked #4 by the WBA. Chudinov went into the fight as a heavy favorite, and did not disappoint. Buglioni showed a lot of heart in the fight, and even managed to drop his opponent. However, the knockdown was ruled as illegal, since Buglioni's right hook connected after the bell rang, causing the referee to deduct two points from the home fighter. From the ninth round onwards, Chudinov seemed to be able to punish Buglioni at will. Chudinov won the fight by unanimous decision (UD).

In October 2015, it was announced that Chudinov has agreed to a rematch against Felix Sturm. The rematch was way more competitive than their first encounter, with both fighters trading but never really causing serious damage to the opponent. In a very close fight, the win was rewarded to the challenger, with one judge scoring the fight a draw at 114–114 while the other two scored it 115–113 in favor of Sturm.

In his next fight, he had an opportunity to regain his title, by fighting for the vacant WBA super-middleweight title against George Groves. The fight was pretty even for the first five rounds. The fifth round ended with both fighters exchanging power shots on the ropes, and both being able to stay on their feet. In the sixth round, however, Groves unleashed a flurry of power punches from the beginning of the round. Even though Chudinov wasn't dropped, the referee noticed he was taking too much punishment, and decided to stop the contest with 1:14 left in the round.

In May 2018, he announced he will be teaming up with boxing trainer Abel Sanchez, which would also allow him to work in a friendly atmosphere with two other of Sanchez' boxers, Gennady Golovkin and Murat Gassiev.

On 21 July 2018, Chudinov fought former light-heavyweight world title challenger Nadjib Mohammedi to a controversial SD win. Many thought Mohammedi was the busier man for most of the rounds, and even the home crowd booing over the decision. One judge had it 118–111 for Mohammedi while the other two had it 116–112 and 115–113 for the home fighter.

On 22 July 2019, Chudinov, ranked #3 by the WBA and #6 by the WBC and IBF, defeated Ezequiel Maderna via tenth-round knockout (KO).

After that, the same year in December he fought former world champion Hassan N'Dam N'Jikam. Chudinov was ranked #1 by the WBA, #6 by the WBC, #8 by the IBF and #11 by the WBO at the time. In what was perhaps Chudinov's best performance up-to-date, he managed to control most of the fight, punishing N'Jikam in the process, especially in the later rounds. N'Jikam made it to the final bell, but Chudinov won the fight convincingly on the scorecards.

Professional boxing record 

{|class="wikitable" style="text-align:center"
|-
!
!Result
!Record
!Opponent
!Type
!Round, time
!Date
!Location
!Notes
|-
|29
|Win
|26–3–1
|style="text-align:left;"|Farrukh Juraev
|UD
|10
|24 Sep 2022
|style="text-align:left;"|
|
|-
|29
|Loss
|25–3–1
|style="text-align:left;"|Azizbek Abdugofurov
|UD
|10
|24 Apr 2022
|style="text-align:left;"|
|
|-
|28
|Win
|25–2–1
|style="text-align:left;"|Ronny Mittag
|RTD
|2 (10), 
|15 Oct 2021
|style="text-align:left;"|
|
|-
|27
|Win
|24–2–1
|style="text-align:left;"|Ryno Liebenberg
|UD
|12
|4 Jun 2021
|style="text-align:left;"|
|style="text-align:left;"|
|-  
|26
|Draw
|23–2–1
|style="text-align:left;"|Isaac Chilemba
|
|10
|20 Feb 2021
|style="text-align:left;"|
|
|-  
|25
|Win
|23–2
|style="text-align:left;"|Umar Sadiq
|TKO
|12 (12), 
|11 Sep 2020
|style="text-align:left;"|
|style="text-align:left;"|
|- 
|24
|Win
|22–2
|style="text-align:left;"|Hassan N'Dam N'Jikam
|UD
|12
|13 Dec 2019
|style="text-align:left;"|
|style="text-align:left;"|
|- 
|23
|Win
|21–2
|style="text-align:left;"|Ezequiel Maderna
|KO
|10 (12), 
|22 Jul 2019
|style="text-align:left;"|
|style="text-align:left;"|
|-
|22
|Win
|20–2
|style="text-align:left;"|Rafael Bejaran
|RTD
|2 (12), 
|16 May 2019
|style="text-align:left;"|
|style="text-align:left;"|
|-
|21
|Win
|19–2
|style="text-align:left;"|Wuzhati Nuerlang
|RTD
|5 (10), 
|23 Mar 2019
|style="text-align:left;"|
|
|-
|20
|Win
|18–2
|style="text-align:left;"|Nadjib Mohammedi
|SD
|12
|21 Jul 2018
|style="text-align:left;"|
|style="text-align:left;"|
|-
|19
|Win
|17–2
|style="text-align:left;"|Timo Laine
|RTD
|7 (12), 
|3 Feb 2018
|style="text-align:left;"|
|style="text-align:left;"|
|-
|18
|Win
|16–2
|style="text-align:left;"|Ryan Ford
|UD
|12
|9 Dec 2017
|style="text-align:left;"|
|style="text-align:left;"|
|-
|17
|Win
|15–2
|style="text-align:left;"|Jonathan Barbadillo
|TKO
|2 (10), 
|22 Jul 2017
|style="text-align:left;"|
|
|-
|16
|Loss
|14–2
|style="text-align:left;"|George Groves
|TKO
|6 (12), 
|27 May 2017
|style="text-align:left;"|
|style="text-align:left;"|
|-
|15
|Loss
|14–1
|style="text-align:left;"|Felix Sturm
|
|12
|20 Feb 2016
|style="text-align:left;"|
|style="text-align:left;"|
|-
|14
|Win
|14–0
|style="text-align:left;"|Frank Buglioni
|UD
|12
|26 Sep 2015
|style="text-align:left;"|
|style="text-align:left;"|
|-
|13
|Win
|13–0
|style="text-align:left;"|Felix Sturm
|
|12
|9 May 2015
|style="text-align:left;"|
|style="text-align:left;"|
|-
|12
|Win
|12–0
|style="text-align:left;"|Ben McCulloch
|KO
|2 (12), 
|11 Dec 2014
|style="text-align:left;"|
|style="text-align:left;"|
|-
|11
|Win
|11–0
|style="text-align:left;"|Andy Perez
|TKO
|3 (9), 
|28 Jun 2014
|style="text-align:left;"|
|style="text-align:left;"|
|-
|10
|Win
|10–0
|style="text-align:left;"|Stjepan Božić
|RTD
|5 (12), 
|23 Mar 2014
|style="text-align:left;"|
|style="text-align:left;"|
|-
|9
|Win
|9–0
|style="text-align:left;"|Francis Cheka
|
|3 (6), 
|31 Dec 2013
|style="text-align:left;"|
|
|-
|8
|Win
|8–0
|style="text-align:left;"|Jimmy Colas
|UD
|10
|15 Nov 2013
|style="text-align:left;"|
|
|-
|7
|Win
|7–0
|style="text-align:left;"|Karama Nyilawila
|TKO
|3 (10), 
|24 Aug 2013
|style="text-align:left;"|
|
|-
|6
|Win
|6–0
|style="text-align:left;"|Julio Acosta
|KO
|4 (8), 
|18 May 2013
|style="text-align:left;"|
|
|-
|5
|Win
|5–0
|style="text-align:left;"|Kostyantyn Lyashik
|TKO
|1 (6), 
|19 May 2012
|style="text-align:left;"|
|
|-
|4
|Win
|4–0
|style="text-align:left;"|Jeremiah Jones
|
|2 (4), 
|25 Mar 2010
|style="text-align:left;"|
|
|-
|3
|Win
|3–0
|style="text-align:left;"|Cesar Ibarra
|
|4
|17 Dec 2009
|style="text-align:left;"|
|
|-
|2
|Win
|2–0
|style="text-align:left;"|Mikhail Lyubarsky
|TKO
|1 (4), 
|22 Aug 2009
|style="text-align:left;"|
|
|-
|1
|Win
|1–0
|style="text-align:left;"|Shawn Kirk
|
|1 (4), 
|10 Jul 2009
|style="text-align:left;"|
|

References

External links

Fedor Chudinov - Profile, News Archive & Current Rankings at Box.Live

1987 births
Living people
Russian male boxers
People from Bratsk
Super-middleweight boxers
Sportspeople from Irkutsk Oblast